Taeniopteryx burksi, the eastern willowfly, is a species of winter stonefly in the family Taeniopterygidae. It is found in North America.

References

Further reading

 
 
 

Taeniopterygidae